Yuri Mikhailovich Kobishchanov (8 October 1934 – 29 July 2022) was a Soviet and Russian Africanist, historian, sociologist and ethnologist. He graduated from the Institute of Asian and African Studies at Moscow State University in 1958.

Works
Axum – Moscow, 1966. 
 
Africa: the emergence of backwardness and the path of development.  – Moscow, 1974 (together with others..). 
The community in Africa.  typology of problems.  – M., 1978 (together with others..). 
North-East Africa in the early-medieval world (VI – VII centuries the middle.).  – M., 1981. 
At the dawn of civilization.  Africa in the ancient world.  – M., 1980. 
Melkonaturalnoe production in communal and caste systems in Africa.  – M., 1982. 
Poljud: The phenomenon of Russian and world history.  – M., 1995. 
Contributor to Essays on the history of Islamic civilization in 2 vols. (ed YM Kobischanova).  – M .: ROSSPEN 2008.

References

External links
Institute for African Studies of the Russian Academy of Sciences  – Yuri Kobishchanov

1934 births
2022 deaths
20th-century Russian historians
Soviet Africanists
Russian Africanists
Soviet academics
Full Members of the Russian Academy of Sciences
Soviet ethnologists
Russian ethnologists
Soviet historians
Soviet sociologists
Russian sociologists
Writers from Kharkiv